Richard Reichel is an Ohio politician in the 1960s through the 1970s. Reichel was appointed in 1973 to serve as the Senator from the 29th District after Ralph Regula won a seat in the United States House of Representatives.  He served from 1973 to 1974, when he and was succeeded by

He was selected to the Massillon Washington High School Honor Role of Distinguished Citizens in 2022.

References

1930 births
Republican Party Ohio state senators
Politicians from Canton, Ohio
Living people